Mathilda Campbell, Duchess of Argyll (née Mathilda Coster Mortimer; 20 August 1925 – 5 June 1997) was a Scottish noblewoman. She was the fourth and final wife of Ian Campbell, 11th Duke of Argyll.

Biography
Mathilda Coster Mortimer was born on 20 August 1925 in Geneva, Switzerland to American parents Stanley Mortimer and his wife Mathilda (née Coster). Her father was a landowner from Litchfield, Connecticut, and her mother was the daughter of the banker William B. Coster. She was raised by her grandparents in France, then eventually went on to study philosophy at Harvard University.

In 1948, Mathilda married Clemens Heller, a professor of human sciences at the University of Paris. They had three sons together before divorcing in 1961.

She met the then-recently divorced Duke of Argyll, Ian Campbell in Scotland not long after her divorce from Heller. Ian Campbell (unknown to Mathilda at the time),had had an affair with her mother in the 1920s. They began a relationship shortly after meeting  and were married in 1963 at the Registry Office in Horsham, West Sussex. The Duke and Duchess had one child together, Lady Elspeth Campbell, born in 1967. However, Elspeth died within a few days of her birth.

In 1969, the Duke and Duchess moved to France, spending time in both Paris and Vézelay. The Duke died in 1973 in Edinburgh.

Campbell was fluent in both French and German. In her later years, she wrote a novel called Orian — A Philosophical Journey, inspired by the death of her youngest son. She also had a keen interest in photography, and once held an exhibition of her work at the Demarco Gallery in Edinburgh.

Campbell died on 5 June 1997 in the American Hospital of Paris, aged 71. She was buried shortly after in Vézelay, near her home.

References

1925 births
1997 deaths
Argyll
Clan Campbell
Duchesses of Argyll